Operation Fusileer was a series of 16 nuclear tests conducted by the United States in 1983–1984 at the Nevada Test Site. These tests followed the Operation Phalanx series and preceded the Operation Grenadier series.

References

Explosions in 1983
Explosions in 1984
1983 in military history
1984 in military history
Fusileer